PVV may refer to:
Politie Voetbal Vereniging, a Surinamese football club
Party for Freedom, a Dutch right-wing populist political party led by Geert Wilders
Party for Freedom and Progress, a Belgian liberal party, active 1961-1992.
PIN Verification Value, a value used to verify a card PIN